Francesco Rocca (born 1 September 1965) is an Italian manager and politician, President of Lazio since 2023.

Biography

First activities 

Rocca approached volunteering from the early years of his university studies in law: first alongside the Jesuit Refugee Service, then with Caritas, and finally with the Piccola casa della Divina Provvidenza. During his university years, he enrolled in the Youth Front, the youth organization of the Italian Social Movement.

In the mid-1990s he began his commitment to the world of healthcare as a manager: from 1996 to 2004, he was president and Commissioner of the Public Institute of assistance and charity (IPAB) "Santa Maria in Aquiro", while from 2001 to 2003 President of IPAB "Asilo della Patria".

In 2003, the then president of Lazio Francesco Storace appointed Rocca general manager of the Sant'Andrea hospital and Extraordinary Commissioner of the Sant'Andrea.

In parallel with his work as a lawyer, he continued his commitment to voluntary work through the Ethiopian NGO Hansenian's Ethiopian Welfare Organization of which, for a short time, he was also director general free of charge, and with the Italian Red Cross, adhering to the component of blood donors. Since the second half of 2007, he has been called upon to hold the position of head of the Emergency Operations Department of the Red Cross. In 2009, during the General Assembly in Kenya, he was elected as a member of the Board of Directors of the International Federation of Red Cross and Red Crescent Societies.

Leading the Red Cross 
Rocca joined the Italian Red Cross in June 2007, becoming extraordinary commissioner in November 2008. In the meantime, a small interlude in the municipality of Rome, during the mayorship of Gianni Alemanno, as head of the Health and Social Activities Department of the Municipality of Rome.

In January 2013, he assumed the position of national president of the Red Cross. Also in 2013, during the general assembly in Sydney, Rocca was elected vice president of the International Federation of Red Cross and Red Crescent Societies. The office of president was renewed for the first time in May 2016, and the second time in May 2020.

President of Lazio 
At the end of 2022, in the vicinity of regional elections in February 2023, the Prime Minister Giorgia Meloni proposes Rocca's name as the official candidate of the centre-right coalition for the office of President of Lazio. By accepting the candidacy, Rocca leaves the leadership of the Red Cross on 29 December 2022.

In the electoral round, characterized by a very low turnout, Rocca was elected governor with 54% of the votes.

Controversies 
At the age of 19, Rocca was convicted of drug dealing heroin, implicated in an investigation into a heavy drug ring run by a group of Nigerians in Casal Palocco, on whose behalf he had sold a pound and a half of drugs to a buyer: arrested in 1985, he was sentenced the following year to 38 months in prison.

References

1965 births
Living people
Presidents of Lazio
Sapienza University of Rome alumni